Jagaddevapura (from Jagad =world + deva = god + puri=city, meaning city of the lord of the world) can refer to:

 Jagadevpur, Telangana
  Jagadevpur, Pakistan